Pasha Yiğit Bey or Saruhanli Pasha Yiğit Bey (also Pasaythus or Basaitus d. 1413) was an Ottoman civil and military officer at the end of the 14th and beginning of the 15th century.

Life 

He was born in Manisa and was of Yörük origin. Yiğit was the tutor of Ishak Bey, the second ruler of Sanjak of Üsküp, and the father of Turahan Bey an Ottoman general, conqueror of Thessaly and warden of its marches. The Ottoman Sultan granted large land estates to Pasha Yiğit Bey and to Ishak Bey for their merits.

He died in Skopje, and was buried in the yard of the notable Meddah Mosque. The mosque and türbe were destroyed during World War II.

Military career 

Pasha Yiğit Bey was one of the Ottoman commanders in the Battle of Kosovo in 1389. In 1390 the Ottomans populated parts of Macedonia (in modern-day northern Greece) with Yürüks from Saruhan. Since Pasha Yiğit Bey was also of Yürük nomadic tribal origin (from Saruhan) he also settled in the same borderland and was appointed as a leader of his fellow tribesmen. In 1392 Pasha Yiğit Bey led the army that took Skopje, thus he was named the conqueror of Skopje by the Ottoman Empire.

Pasha Yiğit Bey became the first lord of the Skopsko Krajište, the borderland province of Ottoman Empire, and served for 21 years, from 1392 to 1413. In spring of 1390, after the Battle of Kosovo, Yiğit was sent by Sultan Bayazid to invade Bosnia which he did, undertaking two campaigns. Pasha Yiğit Bey managed to capture Đurađ II Balšić in a battle and released him after the ransom was paid.

Family tree
After Franz Babinger in the Encyclopedia of Islam:

See also 
 Dzhigit

References

Sources

Further reading 
 Skopski Isakovici i Paşa-jigit beg, GSND XI. (1932)

Year of birth missing
1413 deaths
14th-century births
Military personnel of the Ottoman Empire
14th-century people from the Ottoman Empire
15th-century people from the Ottoman Empire
History of Skopje
People of the Ottoman Interregnum
14th-century Ottoman military personnel
15th-century Ottoman military personnel